The 1981 World Junior Ice Hockey Championships (1981 WJHC) was the fifth edition of the Ice Hockey World Junior Championship and was held from December 27, 1980, until January 2, 1981. The tournament was held in Füssen, West Germany.  Sweden won the gold medal, while Finland won the silver, and the Soviet Union bronze.

Pool A
The 1981 tournament divided participants into two divisions of four teams, each playing three games.  The top two teams in each division advanced to the A division in the medal round, while the bottom two were placed in a B division.  Each division played another round robin.  The top three teams in the A division won the gold, silver and bronze medals. Teams that faced each other in the first round had their results carried over to the medal rounds.

Final standings
This is the aggregate standings, ordered according to final placing.  The four teams in the A division in the medal round were ranked one through four, while the four teams in the B division were ranked five through eight regardless of overall record.

 was relegated to Pool B for the 1982 World Junior Ice Hockey Championships.

Preliminary round

Gold group

Blue group

Consolation round
Results from any games played during the preliminary round were carried forward to the consolation round.

Championship round
Results from any games played during the preliminary round were carried forward to the championship round.

Scoring leaders

Tournament awards

Pool B
The second tier was contested from March 23–29, in Strasbourg, France.  Eight teams were divided into two round robin groups where the top two, and bottom two, graduated to meet their respective opponents in a final round robin.  Results between competitors who migrated together were carried forward.  Yugoslavia made their debut, replacing Hungary.

Preliminary round

Group A

Group B

Consolation round
Results from any games played during the preliminary round were carried forward to the consolation round.

Promotion round
Results from any games played during the preliminary round were carried forward to the promotion round.

 was promoted to Pool A for the 1982 World Junior Ice Hockey Championships.

Scoring leaders

References

 
1977–81 World Junior Hockey Championships at TSN
 Results at passionhockey.com

World Junior Ice Hockey Championships
World Junior Ice Hockey Championships
World Junior Ice Hockey Championships
1981
1980–81 in West German ice hockey
1980 in ice hockey
Ice hockey in Bavaria
World Junior Ice Hockey Championships
World Junior Ice Hockey Championships
World Junior Ice Hockey Championships
Sports competitions in Bavaria
World Junior Ice Hockey Championships
Sports competitions in Strasbourg
20th century in Strasbourg
1980–81 in French ice hockey
International ice hockey competitions hosted by France